Womble Bond Dickinson is a transatlantic law firm formed in 2017 as a result of a merger between UK-based Bond Dickinson LLP and US-based Womble Carlyle Sandridge & Rice, LLP. The combination followed a strategic alliance announcement made in 2016. The firm has 27 locations across the United States and the United Kingdom offering services in 12 different sectors.

The combination created Womble Bond Dickinson (International) LLP; a company limited by guarantee in which Womble Bond Dickinson (UK) LLP and Womble Bond Dickinson (US) LLP, operate as separate non-profit-sharing partnerships.

Overview 
Womble Bond Dickinson employs approximately 1,000 lawyers located in 27 offices in the UK and US. Womble Bond Dickinson is a member of Lex Mundi, a global organization of independent law firms.

History 
UK-based law firm Bond Dickinson LLP commenced trading on May 1, 2013. This alliance was a result of a merger between Dickinson Dees and Bond Pearce. Prior to the merger, Dickinson Dees (whose history dates back to 1975) registered as an LLP in 2006. Bond Pearce (founded in 1887) registered as an LLP in 2005.

Womble Carlyle's history dates back to 1876 and was named after its early partners including B.S. Womble and Irving E. Carlyle.

In January 2016, Womble Carlyle named Betty Temple chairwoman and CEO, and she became one of only a handful of women to sit at the helm of a large national law firm. Temple's appointment represented several milestones for Womble Carlyle. She became the youngest chairperson in the firm's 140-year history, the first chairperson to be located outside of the firm's original Winston-Salem office, and the first woman to lead the firm.

As part of Womble Bond Dickinson, Temple is now US CEO and co-chair with UK Managing Partner, Paul Stewart (appointed in February 2022). 

In March 2020, the firm laid off members of its workforce and reduced compensation for some attorneys and staff due to the COVID-19 pandemic.

References

 Law firms of the United Kingdom
 Companies based in Winston-Salem, North Carolina
 Law firms established in 1876
1876 establishments in North Carolina
 Law firms based in North Carolina

See also 
 List of 100 largest UK law firms
 List of 100 largest European law firms